The 2017 Prime Minister Cup was the first edition of the Prime Minister One Day Cup featuring eight teams. Nepal Police Club and Tribhuwan Army Club were announced as joint winners as the final went to no result due to rain.

Teams
Eastern Development Region
Central Development Region
Western Development Region
Mid-Western Development Region
Far Western Development Region
Nepal Police Club
Tribhuwan Army Club
Armed Police Force Club

Group stage

Group A

Group B

Semi-finals

Final

References

External links
 Series home at ESPN Cricinfo

Prime Minister Cup
Prime Minister Cup